"Only You (And You Alone)" (often shortened to "Only You") is a pop song composed by Buck Ram. It was originally recorded by The Platters with lead vocals by Tony Williams in 1955.

The Platters versions
The Platters first recorded the song for Federal Records on May 20, 1954, but the recording was not released. In 1955, after moving to Mercury Records, the band re-recorded the song (on April 26) and it scored a major hit when it was released in May. In November that year, Federal Records released the original recording as a single (B-side - "You Made Me Cry") which sold poorly.
Platters bass singer Herb Reed later recalled how the group hit upon its successful version: "We tried it so many times, and it was terrible. One time we were rehearsing in the car... and the car jerked. Tony went 'O-oHHHH-nly you.' We laughed at first, but when he sang that song—that was the sign we had hit on something." According to Buck Ram, Tony Williams' voice "broke" in rehearsal, but they decided to keep this effect in the recording.  This was the only Platters recording on which songwriter and manager Ram played the piano.

The song held strong in the number 1 position on the U.S. R & B charts for seven weeks, and hit number five on the Billboard Hot 100 chart. It remained there for 30 weeks, beating out a rival cover version by The Hilltoppers. When the Platters track, "The Great Pretender" (which eventually surpassed the success of "Only You"), was released in the UK as Europe's first introduction to The Platters, "Only You" was included on the flipside. In the 1956 film Rock Around the Clock, The Platters participated with both songs, "Only You" and "The Great Pretender".

The Platters re-recorded a slightly longer version of the song for Musicor Records in 1966, which features on the album I Love You 1,000 Times (MM 2091).

Charts

The Hilltoppers version
The Hilltoppers released their version of the song as a Dot Records single in 1955. It reached number 8 on the Billboard Hot 100 and number 3 in the UK.

Franck Pourcel version

An instrumental version by Franck Pourcel was a hit single in 1959, and sold more than 5 million copies. Pourcel's version spent 16 weeks on the Billboard Hot 100, reaching number 9, while reaching number 3 on Canada's CHUM Hit Parade, and number 18 on Billboards Hot R&B Sides.

Ringo Starr version

In 1974, Ringo Starr covered this song for his album Goodnight Vienna at the suggestion of John Lennon. This version was released as a single (b/w "Call Me") on 11 November in the US, and it became a number six hit on the US Billboard best seller chart and reached number one on the Easy Listening chart in early 1975. It was released in the UK on 15 November. Lennon plays acoustic guitar on the track, and recorded a guide vocal which was kept by producer Richard Perry. Harry Nilsson sings harmony vocals and appears with Starr in the amusing music video filmed on top of the Capitol Records Building in Los Angeles. Lennon's vocal version appears on his Anthology box set, in 1998.

Other notable covers
A version was recorded in 1956 by the Welsh singer Malcolm Vaughan.
In 1957 Gino Latilla presents the Italian version entitled Solo tu - (Cetra Records, SP 27).
Johnny Dorelli recorded the song in 1957 - (CGD, E 6020).
Carl Perkins recorded the song in 1957, on his "Dance Album" record.
The American vocal group Deep River Boys featuring Harry Douglas with Arne Bendiksen's orchestra recorded the song in Oslo on August 8, 1956. It was released on the 78 rpm record HMV AL 6033.
Brenda Lee covered the song on her 1962 album Sincerely, Brenda Lee. When released as a single in Belgium, Lee's version reached number 3 in Flanders and number 44 in Wallonia.
In 1963, Mr. Acker Bilk recorded the song as an instrumental number, which reached number 77 (U.S.).
Little Richard recorded the song in 1964 for his album Little Richard Is Back (And There's a Whole Lotta Shakin' Goin' On!).
Roy Orbison recorded the song in 1969 for the 1970 album The Big O with "The Art Movement"
Bobby Hatfield of the Righteous Brothers released a version in 1969, which reached number 95 on the Billboard Hot 100.
English singer Jeff Collins from Enfield recorded the song in 1972. It was popular in Europe, and rose to number 40 in the UK charts, charting  for eight weeks.
In 1973, the singer Stein Ingebrigtsen had a number one hit on Norway's VG-lista with a Norwegian version of the song, entitled "Bare du". The lyrics were written by the record producer Arve Sigvaldsen. A Swedish version of the song, "Bara du", also recorded by Ingebrigtsen, became popular in that country. Ingebrigtsen also recorded a German version entitled "So wie du" with lyrics written by Ralph-Maria Siegel.
Somewhere in 1973, John Lennon did a demo version for his partner and friend Ringo Starr to be recorded by him for his next solo album, the song can be heard on Lennon's 1990 Wonsaponatime album. 
The pop band Child released the song as a single in 1979, reaching number 33 in the UK Charts.
Reba McEntire had a #13 hit on the U.S. Country music charts with her cover on her 1981 album Heart to Heart.
The Statler Brothers covered the song on their 1986 album Four for the Show. Their version was released as a single and peaked at #36 on the Billboard Hot Country Singles chart. A music video was made for the song and was shot at Opryland USA.
Luis Miguel covered the song on his 1987 album Soy como quiero ser with the title "Solo Tú".
John Alford recorded the song as a double-A side with "Blue Moon" in 1996, which reached number 9 in the UK charts.
Stevie Holland covered this song on her 2006 album More Than Words Can Say.
Alvin and the Chipmunks covered this song in the 2007 film Alvin and the Chipmunks and its soundtrack.
Sam Milby covered this song for the 2009 Philippine drama series Only You.
Hep Stars covered it for their 1965 live album Hep Stars on Stage.
Harry Connick Jr. covered this song on his 2004 album Only You.
A version sung by Mark Hamill (in-character as The Joker) was featured in the end credits of the 2011 video game Batman: Arkham City.

Influence
Dallara, the first Italian shouter (in Italian: urlatore), and his music were influenced by the triplet pattern (in Italian: stile terzinato) that had been introduced in Italy by the Platters in "Only You", and can be heard in their songs such as "Come prima".
In the video game Far Cry 5, the song features prominently as a cult brainwashing trigger.

See also
List of number-one rhythm and blues hits (United States)
List of number-one adult contemporary singles of 1975 (U.S.)

References 
 Footnotes

 Citations

External links
 Vocal Hall Of Fame: The Platters

1954 singles
1954 songs
1955 singles
1959 singles
1963 singles
1969 singles
1974 singles
1976 singles
1996 singles
Apple Records singles
Capitol Records singles
Doug Stone songs
Federal Records singles
Freddie Hart songs
Grammy Hall of Fame Award recipients
Hep Stars songs
Mercury Records singles
Norro Wilson songs
Number-one singles in Norway
Reba McEntire songs
Ringo Starr songs
Song recordings produced by Richard Perry
Songs written by Buck Ram
The Platters songs
The Statler Brothers songs
The Stylistics songs
Train (band) songs
Travis Tritt songs
Warner Records singles